Al's Motors is a historic automobile dealership building located in the Ballston neighborhood of Arlington, Virginia.  It was built in 1948, and is a two-story masonry building in a high-style Streamline Moderne style.  There is a one-story service garage with a barrel-vaulted roof.  The building features rounded corners, a metal-and-glass curtain wall opening onto the automobile showroom, overhanging aluminum cornice, and red string courses mimicking racing stripes along the parapet.  The property was renovated in 2001-2002 for use as a health club.

It was listed on the National Register of Historic Places in 2003.

References

Commercial buildings on the National Register of Historic Places in Virginia
Moderne architecture in Virginia
Commercial buildings completed in 1948
National Register of Historic Places in Arlington County, Virginia
Auto dealerships on the National Register of Historic Places
1948 establishments in Virginia
Transportation buildings and structures on the National Register of Historic Places in Virginia